BKB may refer to:

 Bambai Ka Babu (1996 film), a 1996 Bollywood action film
 Big Knockout Boxing, a combat sport brand developed and owned by DirecTV
 Bikini Karate Babes, a 2002 video game
 BKB (airport), an Indian airport that is currently under construction
 Bollywood Ka Boss, an Indian game show
 Bombai Ka Baboo, a 1960 Hindi film
Brian Banks (American football)